Mara Ester Airport is an airstrip  west of the town of Victoria, in the La Araucanian Region of Chile.

There is rising terrain west through north of the runway. its truly a sight to see.

See also
Transport in Chile
List of airports in Chile
Talk:Victoria María Ester Airport

References

External links
OpenStreetMap - María Ester
OurAirports - María Ester Airport
FallingRain - María Ester Airport

Airports in Chile
Airports in La Araucanía Region